Papi Zothwane (born 17 August 1981 in Bophelong, Gauteng) is a South African former soccer player who played as a midfielder. He is currently assistant manager of Uthongathi.

Personal
Zothwane hails from Bophelong, a township near Vanderbijlpark. His younger brother Nhlanhla Zothwane is also a professional footballer.

Club career
Zothwane played for Golden Arrows between 2003 and 2009 having been signed from Maritzburg City. In his first full season with the club, he was voted PSL Club Rookie of the Year.

He was almost signed by Kaizer Chiefs in 2006 but a contractual dispute ended in him staying with Arrows.

He has been admired for his accurate passing, his pace and his eye for goal. The lanky attacking or central midfielder has been impressive over the last seasons despite being constantly rocked by injuries.

Since the end of the 2007–08 season Zothwane had been liked with big money moves to Kaizer Chiefs and Orlando Pirates. After much speculation surrounding his future after the 2008/2009 season, he signed for Mamelodi Sundowns in July 2009 on a three-year contract for an undisclosed fee.

He joined Bloemfontein Celtic on loan in January 2012. He was released by Mamelodi Sundowns at the end of the season.

International career
Having made his international debut in 2006, he was capped eight times by South Africa.

Coaching career
After holding a coaching role at Sobantu Shooting Stars, He returned to Lamontville Golden Arrows at the beginning of the 2016–17 season as coach of their reserve side.

In September 2020, he joined Uthongathi as assistant manager.

References

External links

1981 births
Living people
South African soccer players
People from Emfuleni Local Municipality
Sportspeople from Gauteng
Association football midfielders
Maritzburg United F.C. players
Lamontville Golden Arrows F.C. players
Mamelodi Sundowns F.C. players
Bloemfontein Celtic F.C. players
South Africa international soccer players